Coleothorpa axillaris is a species of case-bearing leaf beetle in the family Chrysomelidae. It is found in Central America and North America.

Subspecies
These eight subspecies belong to the species Coleothorpa axillaris:
 Coleothorpa axillaris axillaris (J. L. LeConte, 1868) i c g
 Coleothorpa axillaris canella (J. L. LeConte, 1884) i c g
 Coleothorpa axillaris corpilosa (R. Dahl, 1941) i c g
 Coleothorpa axillaris panamintensis (Moldenke, 1970) i c g
 Coleothorpa axillaris quadratominor (Moldenke, 1970) i g b
 Coleothorpa axillaris roseaxillaris (Moldenke, 1970) i c g
 Coleothorpa axillaris rubracanella (Moldenke, 1970) i c g
 Coleothorpa axillaris sierrensis (Moldenke, 1970) i c g
Data sources: i = ITIS, c = Catalogue of Life, g = GBIF, b = Bugguide.net

References

Further reading

 

Clytrini
Articles created by Qbugbot
Beetles described in 1868